Halina Biegun (born 11 June 1955 in Bielsko-Biała) was a Polish luger who competed during the late 1970s. She won the bronze medal in the women's singles event at the 1976 FIL European Luge Championships in Hammarstrand, Sweden. Her trainer was Józef Poraniewski.

References
 List of European luge champions 

Polish female lugers
Living people
1955 births
Sportspeople from Bielsko-Biała